Parovi (English title: Couples) is a Serbian-based reality show created by Predrag Ranković. The show premiered on December 24, 2010 on Happy and immediately reached huge ratings. It also features a 24-hour YouTube live streaming.

Format
Originally the format built on that all contestants were real-life couples, but over the next season, it was changed due to difficulties in looking for actual couples that may be part of the show. Over the next years, there were castings and people with long and interesting histories of their lives were chosen to participate in the show.
The house includes everyday facilities such as a fully equipped kitchen, garden, bedroom, bathroom,  additional rooms, big living room, big pool and a secret room. The prize fund varies and goes up to €250,000 maximum, but many times was a lot below, average between €30,000 — €70,000. In the show appear a lot of contestants from many countries mainly from the Balkans.

Broadcasting
During the regular airing of earlier seasons, a daily and nightly show was broadcast on television. The Morning coffee (Jutarnja kafica) aired between 11am and 2pm, then the show might return at 3pm and end again at 5:30pm, while the evening show would begun at 7pm until later night. The show is currently available 24/7 on a live stream provided by one of its official YouTube channels.

The house
The house is located in Belgrade, in the neighborhood of Zemun. The house has a big bedroom with 24 beds, equipped kitchen, living room, two showers, two restrooms, a secret room, three isolation rooms, a pool and a garden. The original house name is Vila Parova.

Series overview

References

External links
Srbija danas: Parovi
Telegraf: Rijaliti parovi

 
Serbian reality television series
2010 Serbian television series debuts
Nacionalna Televizija Happy original programming